Albert Frank Barrett (11 November 1903 – 8 December 1989) was an English footballer who played as a half-back.

Early and personal life
Barrett was born in West Ham, the third of four children, with two older brothers and one younger sister.

Career
Barrett played as a schoolboy for Fairburn House, and then played for Leytonstone and Middlesex Wanderers in 1921. He signed for West Ham United as an amateur in 1923, leaving a year later (without making a first-team appearance) to sign as an amateur for Southampton. After one league appearance he moved to Fulham in 1925, where he turned professional. He played for the "Professionals" in the 1929 FA Charity Shield. He stayed with the club until 1937, scoring 12 goals in 388 league games.

He made one appearance for the England national team on 19 October 1929.

Later life
Barrett was married with two sons. He worked as an accountant during his professional career, and in 1939 he owned a newsagents/tobacconists shop. After World War II he worked as the secretary of wholesale firm at Romford Market, before emigrating to South Africa in 1954.

References

1903 births
1989 deaths
English footballers
England international footballers
Leytonstone F.C. players
Middlesex Wanderers A.F.C. players
West Ham United F.C. players
Southampton F.C. players
Fulham F.C. players
English Football League players
Association football defenders
British emigrants to South Africa